These hits topped the Ultratop 50 in 2006.

See also
2006 in music

References

2006 in Belgium
Belgium Ultratop 50
2006